The 2014 Trofeo Faip–Perrel was a professional tennis tournament played on hard courts. It was the ninth edition of the tournament which was part of the 2014 ATP Challenger Tour. It took place in Bergamo, Italy between 10 and 16 February 2014.

Singles main-draw entrants

Seeds

 1 Rankings are as of February 3, 2014.

Other entrants
The following players received wildcards into the singles main draw:
  Simone Bolelli
  Matteo Donati
  Andrea Falgheri
  Gianluigi Quinzi

The following players received entry from the qualifying draw:
  Edward Corrie
  Matteo Trevisan
  Federico Gaio
  Karol Beck

Champions

Singles

 Simone Bolelli def.  Jan-Lennard Struff, 7–6(8–6), 6–4

Doubles

 Karol Beck /  Michal Mertiňák def.  Konstantin Kravchuk /  Denys Molchanov, 4–6, 7–5, [10–6]

External links
Official Website

Trofeo Faip-Perrel
Trofeo Faip–Perrel
Trofeo Faip-Perrel